Rubber or natural rubber is a latex material, originally from the Para rubber tree.

Rubber may also refer to:

In science and industry 
Synthetic rubber, general term for many types of man-made rubbers
Latex, emulsions from various plants, and the major raw material in the production of natural rubber
Elastomers, or elastic (rubbery) polymers, particularly man-made rubbers

In arts and entertainment 
Rubber (1936 film), a Dutch film
Rubber (2010 film), a French film
Rubber (Gilby Clarke album), 1998
Rubber (novel), a 1990 Indian Tamil novel by Jeyamohan
Rubber, a name adopted by the band Harem Scarem from 1999–2001
Rubber (Harem Scarem album), 1999
Rubbers, a 2014 Singaporean comedy film

In recreation and sports 
Table tennis rubber, rubber used on the racket of a table tennis racket
Rubber, Rubber bridge or a two 100-point games in contract bridge
In baseball, a slab from which the pitcher throws, or at times, the pitcher's mound itself
In cricket, an individual game in a series of matches
In tennis, an individual game in a series of matches

Other uses 
Condom, in American slang
Eraser, in British and Australian English
Galoshes (rubber boots), in British English

See also

Rubber hose (disambiguation)